Earth-One (also Earth-1) is a name given to two fictional universes (The Pre-Crisis and Post-Crisis versions of the same universe) that have appeared in American comic book stories published by DC Comics. The first Earth-One was given its name in Justice League of America #21 (August 1963), after The Flash #123 (September 1961) explained how Golden Age (Earth-Two) versions of characters such as the Flash (Jay Garrick) could appear in stories with their Silver Age counterparts (Barry Allen). This Earth-One continuity included the DC Silver Age heroes, including the Justice League of America.

Earth-One, along with the four other surviving Earths of the DC Multiverse, are merged into one in the 1985 miniseries Crisis on Infinite Earths. This Earth's versions of characters were primarily the Earth-One versions (i.e. Superman, Batman), but some characters from the four other worlds were also "folded" in. In Infinite Crisis, Earth-One was resurrected and merged with the primary Earth of the publication era to create a New Earth that brought back more aspects of Earth-One's original history. In 2007, a new version of Earth-One was created in the aftermath of events that occurred within the  52 series.

Pre-Crisis version

Flash of Two Worlds

Characters from DC Comics were originally suggestive of each existing in their own world, as superheroes never encountered each other. This was soon changed with alliances being formed between certain protagonists. Several publications, including All-Star Comics (publishing tales of the Justice Society of America), Leading Comics (publishing tales of the Seven Soldiers of Victory) and other comic books introduced a "shared-universe" among several characters during the 1940s until the present day.

Alternative reality Earths had been used in DC stories before, but were usually not referred to after that particular story.  Also most of these alternative Earths were usually so vastly different that no one would confuse that Earth and its history with the so-called real Earth. That would change when the existence of another reliable Earth was established in a story titled "Flash of Two Worlds" in which Barry Allen, the modern Flash later referred to as Earth-One (the setting of the Silver Age stories) first travels to another Earth, accidentally vibrating at just the right speed to appear on Earth-Two, where he meets Jay Garrick, his Earth-Two counterpart.

Major events
More Fun Comics #101 (1944): the first appearance of Superboy. According to canon, the Superman of Earth-Two did not fight crime until reaching Metropolis as an adult, therefore this is the first appearance of Earth-One in comics.
Superman #76 (1952): the first appearance of the Earth-One Batman, teaming up with what must be Earth-One Superman. The two crime fighters meet for the first time in this story. Their Earth-Two counterparts knew each other from their time in the Justice Society of America in the 1940s.
 (1954): Superman and Batman books unofficially make the switch from the Earth-Two characters to the Earth-One characters, though it was not apparent at the time.
Superman's Pal Jimmy Olsen #1 (1954): debut issue of spinoff title for supporting character from the Superman series.
Detective Comics #225 (1955): the first appearance of J'onn J'onzz, the Martian Manhunter.
Showcase #4 (1956): popularly the first Earth-One comic (though not mentioned in text as such), featuring the introduction of Barry Allen as The Flash.
Adventure Comics #246 (1958): unofficially the first appearance of Earth-One Green Arrow.
Wonder Woman #98 (1958): unofficially the first appearance of Earth-One Wonder Woman.
Adventure Comics #260 (1959): the first appearance of Earth-One Aquaman.
Showcase #22 (1959): the first appearance of Hal Jordan, the Green Lantern of Earth-One.
The Brave and the Bold #34 (1961): the first appearance of Katar Hol, the Hawkman of Earth-One.
The Flash #123 (1961): "The Flash of Two Worlds" Barry Allen meets Jay Garrick. This is the first story to explain the concept of the Multiverse, namely that the actions of Barry Allen and Jay Garrick took place on separate but similar Earths.
Showcase #34 (1961): the first appearance of Ray Palmer, the Atom of Earth-One.
Justice League of America #21 (1963): "Crisis on Earth-One" The first team up between the JLA and the JSA, which became a yearly feature in the Justice League of America comic. This is the story in which both Earth-One and Earth-Two were first given names.
Green Lantern (vol. 2) #85 (1971): "Snowbirds Don't Fly" A story focusing on drug addiction, showing Green Arrow's ward Roy Harper addicted to heroin. The story won the 1971 Shazam Award for Best Original Story.
Justice League of America #100 (1972) A story that establishes that the Green Arrow and Speedy appearing in the 1940s were the Earth-2 Green Arrow and Speedy. This annual JLA/JSA team-up featured the return of the Golden Age superhero team the Seven Soldiers of Victory, of which the Golden Age Green Arrow and Speedy were members
Swamp Thing #1 (1972): the first adventure of Alec Holland, the Swamp Thing. The story won the 1972 Shazam Award for Best Original Story.
Justice League of America #244 and Infinity, Inc. #19 (1985): the final team-up of the Justice League and the Justice Society before Earth-One and Earth-Two are merged. 
Crisis on Infinite Earths #10 (1986): The issue in which Earth-One, Earth-Two, Earth-Four (the home of the Charlton Comics heroes), Earth-S (the home of the Fawcett Comics heroes), and Earth-X (the home of the Quality Comics heroes) were combined into one reality, hereafter known as New Earth.
DC Comics Presents #97 (1986): "Phantom Zone: The Final Chapter" The last official Earth-One story.
Superman #423 and Action Comics #583 (1986): "Whatever Happened to the Man of Tomorrow?": The last story of the Superman of Earth-One,  though it is technically classified as an Imaginary Story and not an official Earth-One story. It features cameos by several other Earth-One heroes.

Destruction
Crisis on Infinite Earths (1985–1986) was an effort by DC Comics to clean up their continuity, resulting in the multiple universes, including that of Earth-One, combining into one. This involved the destruction of the multiverse, including Earth-One and the first appearance of the post-Crisis Earth.

Post-52 version

At the end of the Infinite Crisis limited series, the realigned world is called "New Earth". There are now 52 universes: "New Earth" (aka Earth-0), and Earths-1 to 51. In the final issue of the 52 weekly series, it is revealed that fifty-two duplicate worlds have been created and all but New Earth have been altered from the original incarnation.

Earth-1 is featured in the  Superman: Earth One and Batman: Earth One graphic novels.

Characters

In other media
Batman's Earth-One costume is available for download in Batman Arkham City.
In The CW series The Flash, the Flash team encounter metahumans and doppelgangers of friends and colleagues from another inter-dimensional Earth, which they dub "Earth-2" while referring to their own as "Earth-1". Harrison Wells of Earth-2 takes some umbrage at this; although he generally accepts the terminology, he occasionally reminds Cisco Ramon and Barry Allen that his Earth can, from his perspective, be called Earth-1.
A variation of Earth-1 appears in Justice Society: World War II. This universe is also the setting of Superman: Man of Tomorrow and  Batman: The Long Halloween.
 Earth-1 is mentioned in Injustice (2021 film), where  Mister Terrific tells Superman during one scene that he is mapping out the multiverses and muses on the idea that while he would call his universe Earth-1, all their counterparts would do the same with their own universes. This is acknowledged when Mister Terrific recruits the help of an alternate Superman from what Terrific calls Earth-9, which makes the alternate Superman mention that he is from Earth-1 and that they are Earth-22.

See also
 List of DC Multiverse worlds

References

External links
 Earth-One, Earth-Two, Crisis on Infinite Earths at Don Markstein's Toonopedia. Archived from the original on June 3, 2016.

1961 in comics
Fictional elements introduced in 1961
DC Comics dimensions
DC Comics planets
Fiction about Earth